Taylor County Historical Society is a historical society located in the historic Bank of Perry building in Perry, Florida.

The bank building dates to 1903. It became the First National Bank from 1909 to 1930 and its upper floor was used by the law firm of W. B. Davis and Claude Pepper (who later became a U.S. Senator and member of the House of Representatives) during the 1920s.

The Taylor County Historical Society was established October 18, 1971. The organization has published historical information.

References

External links
Taylor County Historical Society page Facebook

Historical societies in Florida
Historic bank buildings
1971 establishments in Florida
Taylor County, Florida